Worksop is a market town in the Bassetlaw District in Nottinghamshire, England. Located close to Nottinghamshire's borders with South Yorkshire and Derbyshire, it is on the River Ryton and not far from the northern edge of Sherwood Forest. Other nearby towns include Chesterfield, Gainsborough, Mansfield and Retford. The population of the town was recorded at 44,733 in 2021 Census.

History

Anglo-Saxon and Anglo-Norman history
Worksop was part of what was called Bernetseatte (burnt lands) in Anglo-Saxon times. The name Worksop is likely of Anglo Saxon origin, deriving from a personal name 'We(o)rc' plus the Anglo-Saxon placename element 'hop' (valley). The first element is interesting because while the masculine name Weorc is unrecorded, the feminine name Werca (Verca) is found in Bede's Life of St Cuthbert. A number of other recorded  place names contain this same personal name element.

In the Domesday Book of 1086, Worksop appears as "Werchesope". Thoroton states that the Doomesday Book records that before the Norman conquest, Werchesope (Worksop) had belonged to Elsi, son of Caschin, who had "two manors in Werchesope, which paid to the geld as three car". After the conquest, Worksop became part of the extensive lands granted to Roger de Busli. At this time, the land "had one car. in demesne, and twenty-two sochm. on twelve bovats of this land, and twenty-four villains, and eight bord. having twenty-two car. and eight acres of meadow, pasture wood two leu. long, three quar. broad." This was valued at 3l in Edward the Confessor's time and 7l in the Domesday Book. De Busli administered this estate from his headquarters in Tickhill.

The manor then passed to William de Lovetot, who established a castle and endowed the Augustinian priory around 1103. After William's death, the manor was passed to his eldest son, Richard de Lovetot, who was visited by King Stephen, at Worksop, in 1161. In 1258, a surviving inspeximus charter confirms Matilda de Lovetot's grant of the manor of Worksop to William de Furnival (her son).

Medieval and early modern history
A skirmish occurred in the area during the Wars of the Roses on 16 December 1460, commonly known as the Battle of Worksop.

In 1530, Worksop was visited by Cardinal Thomas Wolsey, who was on his way to Cawood, in Yorkshire. "Then my lord [Wolsey] intending the next day to remove from thence [Newstead Abbey] there resorted to him the Earl of Shrewsbury's keeper, and gentlemen, sent from him, to desire my lord, in their maister's behalf, to hunt in a parke of their maister's, called Worsoppe Parke." (Cavendish's Life of Wolsey)

A surviving (Cotton) manuscript written by Henry VIII nominated Worksop as one of three places in Nottinghamshire (along with Welbeck and Thurgarton) to become "Byshopprykys to be new made", but nothing was to come of this (White 1875), and the priory later became a victim of the Dissolution of the Monasteries - being closed in 1539, with its prior and 15 monks pensioned off. All the priory buildings, except the nave and west towers of the church, were demolished at this time and the stone reused elsewhere.

In 1540, John Leland noted that Worksop castle had all but disappeared, saying it was: "clene down and scant knowen wher it was". Leland noted that at that time Worksop was "a praty market of 2 streates and metely well buildid."

In the hearth tax records of 1674, Worksop is said to have had 176 households, which made it the fourth-largest settlement in Nottinghamshire after Nottingham (967 households), Newark (339), and Mansfield (318). At this time, the population is estimated to have been around 748 people.

Modern history
By 1743, 358 families were in Worksop, with a population around 1,500. This had risen by 1801 to 3,391, and by the end of the 19th century had reached 16,455.

During the 18th and 19th centuries, Worksop benefitted from the building of the Chesterfield Canal, which passed through the town in 1777, and the subsequent construction of the Manchester, Sheffield and Lincolnshire Railway in 1849. This led to growth that was further boosted by the discovery of coal seams beneath the town.

Transport

Air
Due to its military past, Doncaster Sheffield Airport has a -long runway, so is capable of landing wide-body jets such as Boeing 747s. The Hungarian airline WizzAir continues to serve several European cities, and Thomson Holidays regularly runs charter services from there as part of their package holiday business.

Waterways

Worksop is connected to the UK Inland Waterways network by the Chesterfield Canal. It was built to export coal, limestone, and lead from Derbyshire; iron from Chesterfield; and corn, deals, timber, groceries, and general merchandise into Derbyshire. Today, the canal is used for leisure purposes together with the adjacent Sandhill Lake.

Railway

Worksop lies on the Sheffield-Lincoln line and the Robin Hood line. Northern services run between Sheffield, Lincoln, and Leeds; East Midlands Railway services from Nottingham, via Mansfield, terminate at the station.

Roads
Worksop lies on the A57 and A60, with links to the A1 and M1. The A57 Worksop bypass was opened on Thursday 1 May 1986, by Parliamentary Under-Secretary of State Michael Spicer and the Chairman of Bassetlaw council. The bypass had been due to open in October 1986, and was built by A.F. Budge of Retford; as part of the contract, a small part of the A60 Turner Road was opened on Monday 29 September 1986, three months early.

Cycling
National Cycle Route 6, a waymarked route between London and the Lake District, passes through the town.

Buses
Stagecoach East Midlands operates bus services in and around the town, with destinations including Doncaster, Chesterfield and Nottingham.

Education

Primary

Gateford Park Primary School
Haggonfields Primary and Nursery School
Holy Family Catholic Primary School
Norbridge Academy  
Kingston Park Academy
Langold Dyscarr Community School 
Prospect Hill Infant and Nursery School
Prospect Hill junior school
Ramsden Primary School

Redlands Primary And Nursery School
Sparken Hill Academy 
Sir Edmund Hillary Primary School
The Augustine's Academy
St Anne's C Of E Voluntary aided Primary School
St John's C of E Academy 
St Luke's C of E Aided Primary School
Worksop Priory C of E Primary Academy 
The Primary School of St Mary and St Martin

Secondary 
Outwood Academy Portland
Outwood Academy Valley
Worksop College

Further education
North Nottinghamshire College
Outwood Post-16 centre

Healthcare
Worksop is served by Bassetlaw District General Hospital, part of the Doncaster and Bassetlaw NHS Foundation Trust.  Bassetlaw Hospital treats about 33,000 people each year, ad roughly 38,000 emergencies.  Bassetlaw Hospital is one of the University of Sheffield teaching hospitals and medical school.

Mental health services in Worksop are provided by Nottinghamshire Healthcare NHS Trust, which provide both in-patient and community services. Wards run by Nottinghamshire Healthcare provide training for medical students at the University of Nottingham.

Local economy

Agricultural and forestry
John Harrison's survey of Worksop for the Earl of Arundel reveals that at that time, most people earned their living from the land. A tenant farmer, Henry Cole, farmed 200 acres of land, grazing his sheep on "Manton sheepwalk". This survey also described a corn-grinding water mill (Bracebridge mill) and  Manor Mill situated near to Castle Hill, with a kiln and a malthouse.

One unusual crop associated with Worksop is liquorice. This was originally grown in the priory gardens for medicinal purposes, but continued until around 1750. William Camden records in Britannia that the town was famous for growing liquorice. John Speed noted: "In the west, near Worksop, groweth plenty of Liquorice, very delicious and good". White says the liquorice gardens were "principally situated on the eastern margin of the park, near the present 'Slack Walk'." He notes that the last plant was dug up about "fifty years ago" and that this last garden had been planted by "the person after whom the 'Brompton stock' is named". A pub in Worksop is now named after this former industry.

Additionally, with much of the area being heavily forested, timber was always an important industry, supplying railway sleepers to the North Midland Railway, timber for the construction of railway carriages, and packing cases for the Sheffield cutlery industry. The town also became notable for the manufacture of Worksop Windsor chairs. Timber firms in the town included Benjamin Garside's woodyard and Godley and Goulding, situated between Eastgate and the railway.

Brewing and malting
The malting trade began in Retford, but gradually moved to Worksop, where it became an important trade, though it never employed many people. In 1852, Clinton malt kilns were built. Worksop has a strong tradition of brewing, including being the site of the historic Worksop and Retford Brewery. This brewery had previously been known as Garside and Alderson and Prior Well Brewery.

The brewing tradition is continued by a number of local independent breweries in and around the town, including Welbeck Abbey Brewery.

Mining
At the start of the 19th century, Worksop had a largely agricultural economy with malting, corn milling, and timber working being principal industries. However, the discovery of coal meant that by 1900, the majority of the workforce was employed in coal mining, which provided thousands of jobs - both directly and indirectly - in and around Worksop for most of the 19th and 20th centuries.

The first coal mine was Shireoaks Colliery, which by 1861 employed over 200 men, which rose to 600 men by 1871. Steetley Colliery started producing coal in 1876, and in Worksop a mine was developed on land to the south-east, owned by Henry Pelham-Clinton, 7th Duke of Newcastle. This mine was fully operational in around 1907, with three shafts, and was named Manton Colliery.

The closure in the 1990s of the pits, compounding the earlier decline of the timber trade and other local industry, resulted in high unemployment in parts of the Worksop area, as well as other social problems.

Textiles
In John Harrison's survey of Worksop for the Earl of Arundel, a dye house and a tenter green (where lengths of cloth were stretched out to dry) indicates a small cloth industry was present in Worksop. Late attempts during the Industrial Revolution to introduce textile manufacturing saw two mills constructed, one at Bridge Place and the other somewhere near Mansfield Road. Both enterprises failed and closed within three years. They were converted to milling corn.

Current economy
The local economy in Worksop is dominated by service industries, manufacturing, and distribution. Unemployment levels in the area are now lower than the national average, owing to large number of distribution and local manufacturing companies, including Premier Foods, Wilko, RDS Transport, Pandrol UK Ltd, and Laing O'Rourke.

Major employers in the area include Premier Foods (Worksop Factory), Greencore, Wilko, RDS Transport (the Flying Fridge), B&Q, MAKE polymers, OCG Cacao, part of Cargill, Pandrol, GCHQ, and the National Health Service (Doncaster and Bassetlaw NHS Trust and Nottinghamshire Healthcare NHS Trust).

Religion

Worksop has three churches, all of which are on the National Heritage List for England.

Officially titled the Priory Church of Saint Mary and Saint Cuthbert, the Anglican parish church is usually known as Worksop Priory. It was an Augustinian priory founded in 1103. The church has a nave and detached gatehouse. Monks at the priory made the Tickhill Psalter, an illuminated manuscript of the medieval period, now held in New York Public Library. After the dissolution of the monasteries, the east end of the church fell into disrepair, but the townspeople were granted the nave as a parish church. The eastern parts of the building have been restored in several phases, the most recent being in the 1970s when architect Lawrence King rebuilt the crossing.

St. Anne's Church is an Anglican parish church and is recorded in the National Heritage List for England as a designated Grade-II listed building. The church was built in 1911 by the Lancaster architects Austin and Paley. The church has an historic pipe organ originally built by Gray and Davison in 1852 for Clapham Congregational Church.

St. John's Church is a parish church built between 1867 and 1868 by architect Robert Clarke.

St Mary's is a Roman Catholic church, built from 1838 to 1840 and paid for by the Bernard Howard, 12th Duke of Norfolk, after the sale of Worksop Manor, which the duke owned. The church was designed by Matthew Ellison Hadfield and it is a Grade II-listed building. In late 1913, the church was visited by Archduke Franz Ferdinand seven months before his assassination in Sarajevo. 

Relatively few religious minorities live in the town, with the largest non-Christian community being Worksop's 243 Muslims. A small community and prayer centre for adherents is on Watson Road.

Places of interest

Mr Straw's House, the family home of the Straw family, was inherited by the Straw brothers, William and Walter, when their parents died in the 1930s. The house remained unaltered until the National Trust acquired it in the 1990s and opened it to the public. 

Clumber Park, south of Worksop, is a country park, also owned by the National Trust, and is open to the public.

Worksop Town Hall was originally established as a corn exchange, designed by Isaac Charles Gilbert, which opened in 1851.

Notable people

A'Whora (real name George Boyle, b. 1996), drag queen, fashion designer and TV personality, known from RuPaul's Drag Race UK.
James Walsham Baldock (1822–1898), artist, adopted by his grandfather who was a farmer at Worksop
Maurice Bembridge (b.1945), golfer
George Best, former goalkeeper with Blackpool F.C.
Basil Boothroyd (1910-1988), humorous writer
Bruce Dickinson (b.1958), singer with Iron Maiden
Craig Disley (b.1981), footballer
Mark Foster (b.1975), golfer
Anne Foy (b.1986), former BBC Children's TV presenter
Alexina Graham (b.1990), model and Victoria's Secret Angel
Gwen Grant (b.1940), writer
Henry Haslam (1879-1942), footballer and Olympic gold medalist at the 1900 Olympics
Sarah-Jane Honeywell (b.1974), BBC Children's TV presenter
William Henry Johnson (1890-1945), recipient of a Victoria Cross
Mick Jones (b.1945), Sheffield United and Leeds United striker during the 1960s and 70s
Sam Osborne (b.1993), racing driver
John Parr (b.1954), musician
Henry Pickard (1832-1905), cricketer
Donald Pleasence (1919-1995), actor
Graham Taylor (1944-2017), former England, Aston Villa F.C. and Watford F.C. manager
Danny Thomas (b.1961), footballer, played for Coventry City F.C. and Tottenham Hotspur
Sam Walker (b.1995), table tennis player
Darren Ward (b.1974), former football goalkeeper
Lee Westwood (b.1973), golfer
Elliott Whitehouse (b.1993), footballer
Chris Wood (b.1987), footballer

See also
Listed buildings in Worksop

References

Further reading

External links

Worksop, The Dukery and Sherwood Forest, by Robert White (1875)
Worksop Guardian
Bassetlaw District Council
MyWorksop

 
Market towns in Nottinghamshire
Towns in Nottinghamshire
Unparished areas in Nottinghamshire
Bassetlaw District